Christian Erland Harald von Koenigsegg (born July 2, 1972) is an automotive engineer and entrepreneur. He is the founder and CEO of the Swedish high-performance automobile manufacturer Koenigsegg Automotive.

In 1994, Koenigsegg launched the "Koenigsegg project", which eventually became Koenigsegg Automotive. Together with designer David Crafoord, Koenigsegg created a design concept following his original sketches. The first prototype enabled the foundation of Koenigsegg Automotive. Koenigsegg and his wife, Halldóra, are leading the company.

Early life
Christian von Koenigsegg is the son of Jesko von Koenigsegg, CEO of JK Energiteknik, and fashionista Brita Aasa. The Koenigsegg lineage is attested from CE 1171 and originates in Swabia Germanic-Roman Empire where his ancestors were knights (see Königsegg for details). The current logo of Koenigsegg Automotive is based on the Königsegg familial coat of arms.

Koenigsegg grew up in Stockholm, and spent a year in high school in Danderyd before enrolling at Lundsbergs boarding school, and then studied economics at the Scandinavian School of Brussels. He showed an interest in cars from an early age, starting at the age of five when he watched the stop-motion film The Pinchcliffe Grand Prix, about a bicycle builder who built a racing car, . When he was six years old, he drove a go-kart for the first time, and he vividly recalls this as "one of the best days of his life".

Koenigsegg Automotive 

Christian von Koenigsegg founded Koenigsegg Automotive AB in 1994 in hopes of producing a "world-class" sports car. This company was financed initially with money from Christian's previous business ventures. He also received $200 thousand from the Swedish technical development board. Christian's father became an early investor and financed the operation for over 3 years. Halldora von Koenigsegg became involved in 2000 as the COO.

Innovations
Christian von Koenigsegg has come up with many innovations and several of them are patented. To name a few - the click flooring system, the Triplex rear suspension, the top mounted active rear wing system, the patented Koenigsegg synchro helix door actuation system, the patented rocket catalytic converter, the patented dual throttle compressor pressure relief system, the patented direct drive transmission, a patented hollow core composite production system, a patent pending dielectric coolant system and several patents for Freevalve — an innovation that uses electronics and air pressure to actuate intake and exhaust valves. This provides very high precision and unlimited timing control, instead of the traditional camshaft, allowing for engines to be much more efficient by reducing weight and size of engines, while making each cylinder able to be controlled independently, allowing for more complete combustion.

Personal life 
Christian von Koenigsegg married Halldóra Tryggvadóttir in 2000, and there are competing stories about where they met. Some sources say that they met during their studies in Brussels, while other sources say they met while in high school. They presently have 2 sons, Sebastian and Samuel. Sebastian von Koenigsegg currently works at Koenigsegg Automotive AB as a Brand & Content Manager.

Honours 
 2014 EY Entrepreneur Of The Year in South Sweden (February 2015)
 2013 Entrepreneur Of The Year from Ängelholm Näringsliv (May 2014)

References

External links

Koenigsegg Automotive

1972 births
Living people
Swedish founders of automobile manufacturers
Swedish people of German descent
Swedish chief executives in the automobile industry